Sangduen Manwong (nicknamed Toom ; ; born January 1, 1949) was Miss Thailand 1968.
She was crowned Miss Thailand on December 3, 1968. She competed in the Miss Universe 1969 pageant competition held in United States and won best national costume.

References

1949 births
Living people
Sangduen Manwong
Miss Universe 1969 contestants
Sangduen Manwong